The Roman Catholic Diocese of Ijebu-Ode is a diocese located in the city of Ijebu-Ode in the Ecclesiastical province of Lagos in Nigeria.

History
 29 May 1969: Established as Diocese of Ijebu-Ode from Metropolitan Archdiocese of Lagos
1883  Rev. Fathers Chause and Holley came to Epe, but the pagans   prevented an establishment of the Faith.
1892 Conquest of Ijebu by the English, Freedom of Religion, Msgr. Joseph Lang with Revd. Fathers Pied, and Barlaglia travelled from Ibadan to Ijebu-Ode, stayed one night at Chief Olisa's house and said Mass, before leaving the next day. Revds. Elliot and Payne established in Ijebu-Imusin a Church of the Church Mission Society, in Esure.
29 July 1902 – Santa Congregation de Propaganda introduced the Catholic Church to lbonwon.

Special churches
The Cathedral is St Sebastian's Cathedral in Ijebu-Ode.

Bishops
 Bishops of Ijebu-Ode (Roman rite)
 Bishop Anthony Saliu Sanusi (1969.05.29 – 1990.08.14)
Bishop Albert Ayinde Fasina (1990.08.14 - 2019.01.17); retired, Bishop Emeritus
 Bishop Francis Obafemi Adesina (since 2019.01.17); formerly Rector of Saints Peter and Paul Seminary in Ibadan, Nigeria

Coadjutor Bishop
Albert Ayinde Fasina (1988-1990)

See also
Roman Catholicism in Nigeria

Sources
 GCatholic.org Information
 Catholic Hierarchy

References

External links 
 https://www.ijebuodecatholicdiocese.org

Roman Catholic dioceses in Nigeria
Christian organizations established in 1969
Roman Catholic dioceses and prelatures established in the 20th century
Ijebu Ode
Roman Catholic Ecclesiastical Province of Lagos